The Love Collection may refer to:
 The Love Collection (Dionne Warwick album)
 The Love Collection (Anna Vissi album)
 The Love Collection (Jinny Ng album)